Böjöy is a village in Batken Region of Kyrgyzstan. It is part of the Batken District. Nearby towns and villages include Kojo-Korum and Lembur. Its population was 906 in 2021.

References

External links 
Satellite map at Maplandia.com

Populated places in Batken Region